The 2010–11 Scottish Challenge Cup, known as the ALBA Challenge Cup due to sponsorship reasons with MG Alba, was the 20th season of the competition, competed for by all 30 members of the Scottish Football League. The defending champions were Dundee, who defeated Inverness Caledonian Thistle 3–2 in the 2009 final. Dundee were knocked out in the second round after being defeated 4–1 by Stenhousemuir.

The Challenge Cup was won by Ross County, who defeated Queen of the South 2–0 in the final at McDiarmid Park in Perth to win the cup for the second time in their history.

Schedule

Fixtures and results

First round 

The first round draw took place on 27 May 2010.

North and East region 
Forfar Athletic received a random bye to the second round.

Source: Scottish Football League

South and West region 
Berwick Rangers received a random bye to the second round.

Source: Scottish Football League

Second round 

The second round draw was conducted on 27 July 2010 at Hampden Park.

Source: Scottish Football League

Quarter-finals 

The quarter-final draw was conducted on 12 August 2010 at Hampden Park.

Semi-finals 

The semi-final draw was conducted on 9 September 2010 at Hampden Park.

Final

References

External links 
 BBC Scottish Cups page
 Scottish Football League Challenge Cup page

Scottish Challenge Cup seasons
Challenge Cup
3